Cadet Billy Forbes (born 13 December 1990) is a Turks and Caicos Islander professional footballer. He scored the game-winning goal in the 2014 Soccer Bowl.

Club career
Forbes spent his early career with Provopool Celtic and AFC Academy. In 2009, after training with the Vancouver Whitecaps, Forbes won a scholarship with Western Texas College. He also played college soccer for Lubbock Christian University.

Forbes played during the summer of 2012 for the Mississippi Brilla of the USL PDL. and in May 2014 he joined San Antonio Scorpions from WV King's Warriors.

The San Antonio Scorpions organization ceased operations following the 2015 NASL season. Forbes signed with NASL expansion side Rayo OKC on 28 January 2016.

After spending the 2018 season with Phoenix Rising, he returned to San Antonio FC for the 2019 season.

Forbes joined USL Championship club Austin Bold FC in January 2020.

Forbes moved to USL Championship side Miami FC on 11 January 2021.

Forbes was signed by Detroit City FC on 2 March 2022. In July 2022 he was loaned to Canadian Premier League side Valour FC. He left Detroit following their 2022 season.

International career
He made his debut for Turks and Caicos in a February 2008 World Cup qualification match against Saint Lucia and has, as of January 2018, earned a total of 6 caps scoring one goal. He represented his country in two World Cup qualification games.

Career statistics

References

1990 births
Living people
Association football forwards
Turks and Caicos Islands footballers
Turks and Caicos Islands international footballers
Mississippi Brilla players
Southern West Virginia King's Warriors players
San Antonio Scorpions players
Rayo OKC players
San Antonio FC players
Phoenix Rising FC players
Austin Bold FC players
Miami FC players
Detroit City FC players
Turks and Caicos Islands expatriate footballers
Expatriate soccer players in the United States
Turks and Caicos Islands expatriate sportspeople in the United States
Expatriate soccer players in Canada
Turks and Caicos Islands expatriates in Canada
USL League Two players
North American Soccer League players
USL Championship players
Lubbock Christian Chaparrals men's soccer players
Western Texas Westerners men's soccer players
AFC Academy players
Valour FC players